Michèle Delaunay (born Clermont-Ferrand, 8 January 1947) is a French politician who, until her appointment as Junior Minister for the Elderly and Dependent Care at the Ministry of Social Affairs and Health by President François Hollande on 16 May 2012, was a member of the National Assembly of France where she represented the 2nd constituency of the Gironde on behalf of the Socialist Party.

On 15 April 2013 she was forced to reveal personal financial information by President Francois Hollande, who demanded that all ministers publish details of their personal wealth. Her net worth was reported at over $7,000,000 including $20,000 worth of jewelry.

Career

Governmental function

Minister for the Elderly and Dependent Care : Since May 2012.

Electoral mandates

Member of the National Assembly of France for Gironde (2nd constituency) : Since 2007. Elected in 2007.

General councillor of Gironde : Since 2004. Reelected in 2011.

Municipal councillor of Bordeaux : 2001-2007 (Resignation).

References

1947 births
Living people
Politicians from Clermont-Ferrand
Socialist Party (France) politicians
Women members of the National Assembly (France)
Deputies of the 13th National Assembly of the French Fifth Republic
Deputies of the 14th National Assembly of the French Fifth Republic
21st-century French women politicians
Women government ministers of France